Asyprocessa wapi is a moth of the family Erebidae first described by Michael Fibiger in 2010. It is known from southern Laos, in Southeast Asia.

Description
The wingspan of Asyprocessa wapi is about 9 mm. The head, patagia, tegulae, thorax and the ground colour of the forewing are brown suffused with dark brown scales.

The basal part of costa, costal part of the medial area, subterminal, and terminal area, including the fringes are blackish brown. The costal medial area is quadrangular. The forewing is narrow, pointed at the apex and brown. The hindwing is grey and the discal spot absent.

References

Micronoctuini
Moths of Asia
Moths described in 2010